Donald Sanchez (born August 8, 1984) is an American mixed martial artist currently competing in the Featherweight division. A professional competitor since 2005, he has competed for Bellator, Absolute Championship Berkut, King of the Cage, the MFC, Legacy FC, and the RFA.

Mixed martial arts career

Bellator MMA
Sanchez faced Johnny Eduardo on April 17, 2009 at Bellator III. He lost the fight via unanimous decision.

Sanchez defeated Cliff Wright at Bellator 97 on July 31, 2013 via split decision.

Absolute Championship Berkut
Sanchez signed a four-fight deal with the ACB in October 2016.

His debut at ACB were on 18 December 2016 at ACB 50: Rasulov vs. Goltsov in St.Petersburg, Russia against Adlan Bataev. He lost the fight via unanimous decision (29–28, 29–28, 29–28).

Sanchez was expected to face Yusuf Raisov on March 24, 2017 at the ACB 55. However, Sanchez pulled out a few days before the fight and was replaced by Valdines Silva.

Sanchez faced Alexey Polpudnikov on July 23, 2017 at ACB 65. He lost the fight via knockout in the first round.

Mixed martial arts record

|-
| Loss
| align=center| 31–18
| Rey Trujillo  
| KO (punches)
| Rocks Xtreme MMA 23
| 
| align=center| 3
| align=center| 5:00
| Corpus Christi, Texas, United States
| 
|-
| Loss
| align=center| 31–17
| Alexey Polpudnikov  
| KO (punches)
| ACB 65: Silva vs. Agnaev
| 
| align=center| 3
| align=center| 5:00
| Sheffield, England
| 
|-
| Loss
| align=center| 31–16
| Adlan Bataev
| Decision (unanimous)
| ACB 50: Stormbringer
| 
| align=center| 3
| align=center| 5:00
| St.Petersburg, Leningrad, Russia
| 
|-
| Win
| align=center| 31–15
| Nick Rhoads
| Decision (unanimous)
| Jackson's MMA Series 16
| 
| align=center| 3
| align=center| 5:00
| Santa Fe, New Mexico, United States
| 
|-
| Loss
| align=center| 30–15
| Mark Dickman
| Submission (kimura)
| RFA 22: Smith vs. Njokuani
| 
| align=center| 1
| align=center| 1:37
| Colorado Springs, Colorado, United States
| 
|-
| Win
| align=center| 30–14
| Charles Cheeks III
| Decision (unanimous)
| LFC 36: Legacy Fighting Championship 36
| 
| align=center| 3
| align=center| 5:00
| Allen, Texas, United States
| 
|-
| Loss
| align=center| 29–14
| Flavio Alvaro
| Decision (unanimous)
| LFC 30: Legacy Fighting Championship 30
| 
| align=center| 3
| align=center| 5:00
| Albuquerque, New Mexico, United States
| 
|-
| Win
| align=center| 29–13
| Cliff Wright
| Decision (split)
| Bellator XCVII
| 
| align=center| 3
| align=center| 5:00
| Rio Rancho, New Mexico, United States
| 
|-
| Win
| align=center| 28–13
| Matt Comeau
| TKO (punches)
| KOTC: Regulators
| 
| align=center| 2
| align=center| 4:46
| Scottsdale, Arizona, United States
| 
|-
| Win
| align=center| 27–13
| Jimmy Van Horn
| Submission (punches)
| KOTC: Ignite
| 
| align=center| 1
| align=center| 2:32
| Santa Fe, New Mexico, United States
| 
|-
| Win
| align=center| 26–13
| Warren Stewart
| Decision (unanimous)
| KOTC: Nightmare
| 
| align=center| 5
| align=center| 5:00
| Santa Fe, New Mexico, United States
| 
|-
| Loss
| align=center| 25–13
| Tatsuya Kawajiri
| Submission (triangle choke)
| One FC 3: War of the Lions
| 
| align=center| 1
| align=center| 3:27
| Kallang, Singapore
|Returned to Featherweight.
|-
| Win
| align=center| 25–12
| Jamie Steichen
| TKO (punches)
| KOTC: Prohibited
| 
| align=center| 1
| align=center| 2:05
| Norman, Oklahoma, United States
|Won the vacant King of the Cage Lightweight Championship.
|-
| Win
| align=center| 24–12
| Chris Culley
| KO (punches)
| KOTC: Night Stalker
| 
| align=center| 1
| align=center| 4:45
| Santa Fe, New Mexico, United States
| 
|-
| Win
| align=center| 23-12
| Ira Boyd
| Submission (rear-naked choke)
| KOTC: Apocalypse
| 
| align=center| 1
| align=center| 2:52
| Thackerville, Oklahoma, United States
| 
|-
| Loss
| align=center| 22-12
| Jeremy Spoon
| Decision (split)
| KOTC: Overdrive
| 
| align=center| 5
| align=center| 5:00
| Norman, Oklahoma, United States
| 
|-
| Loss
| align=center| 22-11
| Hatsu Hioki
| Submission (triangle choke)
| Shooto: Shooto Tradition 2011
| 
| align=center| 2
| align=center| 1:36
| Tokyo, Japan
| 
|-
| Win
| align=center| 22-10
| Scott Bear
| Submission (guillotine choke)
| KOTC: Confrontation
| 
| align=center| 1
| align=center| 3:02
| Santa Fe, New Mexico, United States
| 
|-
| Win
| align=center| 21-10
| Pat McGreal
| Submission (rear-naked choke)
| KOTC: No Mercy
| 
| align=center| 1
| align=center| 2:27
| Mashantucket, Connecticut, United States
| 
|-
| Win
| align=center| 20-10
| Angelo Sanchez
| Decision (split)
| KOTC: Honor
| 
| align=center| 5
| align=center| 5:00
| Mescalero, New Mexico, United States
|Won the King of the Cage Featherweight Championship.
|-
| Win
| align=center| 19-10
| Victor Valenzuela
| TKO (punches)
| KOTC: Vengeance
| 
| align=center| 4
| align=center| 4:05
| Mescalero, New Mexico, United States
| 
|-
| Win
| align=center| 18-10
| Richard Montano
| Decision (unanimous)
| KOTC: Horse Power
| 
| align=center| 5
| align=center| 5:00
| Mescalero, New Mexico, United States
| 
|-
| Win
| align=center| 17-10
| John Sargent
| TKO (punches)
| NLCF: Storm
| 
| align=center| 1
| align=center| 1:23
| Cheyenne, Wyoming, United States
| 
|-
| Win
| align=center| 16-10
| Lazar Stojadinovic
| Decision (unanimous)
| KOTC: Gate Keeper
| 
| align=center| 5
| align=center| 5:00
| Mescalero, New Mexico, United States
| 
|-
| Loss
| align=center| 15-10
| Angelo Sanchez
| Decision (split)
| KOTC: Retribution II
| 
| align=center| 5
| align=center| 5:00
| Mescalero, New Mexico, United States
| 
|-
| Loss
| align=center| 15-9
| Johnny Eduardo
| Decision (unanimous)
| Bellator III
| 
| align=center| 3
| align=center| 5:00
| Norman, Oklahoma, United States
|Catchweight (147 lbs) bout.
|-
| Loss
| align=center| 15-8
| Victor Valenzuela
| Decision (unanimous)
| KOTC: Immortal
| 
| align=center| 5
| align=center| 5:00
| Highland, California, United States
| 
|-
| Win
| align=center| 15-7
| Nathan Randall
| TKO (punches)
| KOTC: Goodfellas
| 
| align=center| 1
| align=center| 4:41
| Albuquerque, New Mexico, United States
| 
|-
| Win
| align=center| 14-7
| Darryl Madison
| Submission
| FW 16: International
| 
| align=center| 1
| align=center| 4:00
| Albuquerque, New Mexico, United States
| 
|-
| Win
| align=center| 13-7
| Jason Maxwell
| Submission (triangle choke)
| MFC 17: Hostile Takeover
| 
| align=center| 2
| align=center| 4:03
| Edmonton, Alberta, Canada
| 
|-
| Win
| align=center| 12-7
| Titus Holmes
| Submission (rear-naked choke)
| KOTC: Badlands
| 
| align=center| 1
| align=center| 3:14
| Albuquerque, New Mexico, United States
| 
|-
| Win
| align=center| 11-7
| William Sriyapai
| TKO
| KOTC: Opposing Force
| 
| align=center| 2
| align=center| 3:41
| Highland, California, United States
| 
|-
| Loss
| align=center| 10-7
| Justin Moore
| Decision (split)
| FCF: Freestyle Cage Fighting 17
| 
| align=center| 3
| align=center| 3:00
| Shawnee, Oklahoma, United States
| 
|-
| Win
| align=center| 10-6
| R Romero
| Submission (armbar)
| KOTC: Warlords
| 
| align=center| 2
| align=center| 0:00
| Towaoc, Colorado, United States
| 
|-
| Loss
| align=center| 9-6
| Ryan Heck
| Decision (unanimous)
| MFC 14: High Rollers
| 
| align=center| 3
| align=center| 5:00
| Edmonton, Alberta, Canada
| 
|-
| Loss
| align=center| 9-5
| Vito Woods
| Decision (unanimous)
| KOTC: Hierarchy
| 
| align=center| 2
| align=center| 5:00
| Albuquerque, New Mexico, United States
| 
|-
| Win
| align=center| 9-4
| Ryan McGillivray
| Decision (unanimous)
| MFC 13: Lucky 13
| 
| align=center| 3
| align=center| 5:00
| Edmonton, Alberta, Canada
| 
|-
| Loss
| align=center| 8-4
| Cody Shipp
| Submission (armbar)
| FW 15: Rumble at Rt. 66 Casino
| 
| align=center| 3
| align=center| 0:38
| Albuquerque, New Mexico, United States
| 
|-
| Win
| align=center| 8-3
| Donnie Frye
| Submission (armbar)
| MCC: Midwest Cage Combat
| 
| align=center| 1
| align=center| 4:30
| Wichita, Kansas, United States
| 
|-
| Win
| align=center| 7-3
| Patrick Lopez
| KO (knee)
| FW 14: Cinco de Whoop Ass 2
| 
| align=center| 1
| align=center| 0:00
| New Mexico, United States
| 
|-
| Win
| align=center| 6-3
| Donnie Martinez
| KO (punches)
| DE: World War
| 
| align=center| 2
| align=center| 0:30
| New Mexico, United States
| 
|-
| Loss
| align=center| 5-3
| Buddy Clinton
| Submission (rear-naked choke)
| KOTC: Cyclone
| 
| align=center| 1
| align=center| 2:51
| Tulsa, Oklahoma, United States
| 
|-
| Win
| align=center| 5-2
| Mark Kempthorne
| TKO (punches)
| KOTC: BOOYAA
| 
| align=center| 2
| align=center| 4:14
| San Jacinto, California, United States
| 
|-
| Loss
| align=center| 4-2
| Johnny Vasquez
| Submission
| KOTC: Rapid Fire
| 
| align=center| 2
| align=center| 2:44
| San Jacinto, California, United States
| 
|-
| Win
| align=center| 4-1
| Robert Montiel
| TKO (corner stoppage)
| DE: Desert Extreme
| 
| align=center| 1
| align=center| 5:00
| New Mexico, United States
| 
|-
| Win
| align=center| 3-1
| Christian Montano
| Submission (triangle choke)
| DE: Mayhem
| 
| align=center| 1
| align=center| 1:54
| Santa Fe, New Mexico, United States
| 
|-
| Loss
| align=center| 2-1
| Donnie Martinez
| Submission (guillotine choke)
| DE: Socorro
| 
| align=center| 1
| align=center| 2:53
| New Mexico, United States
| 
|-
| Win
| align=center| 2-0
| Joe Montoya
| TKO
| DE: Tribal Nation
| 
| align=center| 1
| align=center| 0:00
| New Mexico, United States
| 
|-
| Win
| align=center| 1-0
| Joseph Davidson
| Submission (rear-naked choke)
| DE: Socorro Showdown
| 
| align=center| 1
| align=center| 1:02
| New Mexico, United States
|

See also
List of male mixed martial artists

References

External links
 
 
 
 
 Donald Sanchez Looking To Start 2015 Off Right At RFA 22 at MMAweekly.com

1984 births
Living people
American male mixed martial artists
Featherweight mixed martial artists
Lightweight mixed martial artists
Welterweight mixed martial artists
Sportspeople from Albuquerque, New Mexico